The Liga Nacional de Handebol 2016 (2016 National Handball League) was the 20th season of the top tier Brazilian handball national competitions for clubs, it is organized by the Brazilian Handball Confederation. There, for the third time, Handebol Taubaté was crowned champion.

Teams qualified for the play-offs stage
South Southeast Conference
 Handebol Taubaté
 EC Pinheiros
 Handebol São Caetano
 Handebol Maringá
Northeastern Conference
 Hollanda Codó
 Maracanã Handebol
Northern Conference
 Adalberto Valle
 Clube do Remo

Play-offs

Final Match

Individual awards
Best Player:  Leonardo Dutra
Top Scorer:  Arthur Pereira
Best Goalkeeper:  Marcos Paulo Santos

References

External links
Tournament page on CBHb official web site

Bra